Ivano Pizzi (born 1 July 1982) is an Italian paralympic cyclist who won two medals at the 2012 Summer Paralympics.

He is the brother of his guide Luca Pizzi.

References

External links
 

1982 births
Living people
Paralympic cyclists of Italy
Paralympic gold medalists for Italy
Paralympic silver medalists for Italy
Sportspeople from Barrie
Medalists at the 2012 Summer Paralympics
Paralympic medalists in cycling
Cyclists at the 2012 Summer Paralympics